Acton station may refer to the following stations:

Acton, London, England
 Acton Central railway station (originally known as just Acton), a London Overground station on the North London Line (formerly the North and South Western Junction Railway)
 Acton Green station, the former name of Chiswick Park tube station, a London Underground station on the District line
 Acton Main Line railway station (originally known as just Acton), a station on the Great Western Main Line, served by TfL Rail (future Crossrail)
 Acton Town tube station, a London Underground station on the District and Piccadilly lines
 East Acton tube station, a London Underground station on the Central line
 North Acton tube station, a London Underground station on the Central line, and a former Great Western Railway station on the New North Main Line (Acton–Northolt Line)
 South Acton railway station, a London Overground station on the North London Line, and a former London Underground station on a spur of the District line
 West Acton tube station, a London Underground station on the Central line's branch to Ealing Broadway

Elsewhere
 Acton Bridge railway station, on the West Coast Main Line in Acton, Cheshire, England
 Acton GO Station, a GO Transit station on the Kitchener line in Acton, Ontario, Canada
South Acton station, an MBTA Commuter Rail station on the Fitchburg Line, Acton, Massachusetts, United States
 West Acton station, a former commuter rail station on the Fitchburg Line, Acton, Massachusetts, U.S.
 Vincent Grade/Acton station, a Metrolink station on the Antelope Valley Line in Acton, California, United States

See also
Acton (disambiguation)
South Acton (disambiguation)